Mahabharat Murders is a Bengali thriller series streaming on Hoichoi from 13 May 2022, based on the book The Mahabharata Murders by Arnab Ray. The series is directed by Soumik Halder and stars Priyanka Sarkar, Arjun Chakrabarty, Saswata Chatterjee, Kaushik Sen, Rajdeep Gupta.

Plot 
The story happens in Kolkata and follows a serial killer who considers himself as modern-day Duryodhana and takes a dramatic spin over the Mahabharata’s narrative.

Cast 
 Priyanka Sarkar as Ruksana Ahmed, I.P.S., an investing officer at Kolkata Police detective department
 Arjun Chakrabarty as Siddhanth Singha, Ruksana's side-kick
 Saswata Chatterjee as Pabitra Chatterjee, a politician
 Kaushik Sen as Abirlal, Pabitra's advisor
 Rajdeep Gupta as Prakash Sharma, CEO of Ycon Consultancy
 Rishav Basu as Vicky Patel
 Arna Mukhopadhyay as Dr. Bipul Bannerjee
 Debashis Mondal as Javed, Ruksana's estranged partner
 Sudip Mukherjee as Surojit Mukherjee, Police Commissioner at Kolkata Police and Ruksana's senior
 Satyam Bhattacharya as Joy, a cyber specialist at Kolkata Police detective department and an Indian classical music enthusiast
 Arpita Ghosh as Devika Lahiri
 Riyaa Ganguly as Tania, Devika's flatmate
 Aparajita Ghosh as Kanika Basu, Director at YCon and Prakash's ex
 Jammy Bannerjee as Shamsuddin
 Bihaan Saha Dalal as Salim, Ruksana’s son

Season 1 
This season will take the viewers on a mysterious and suspenseful trip based on Arnab Ray’s novel ‘Mahabharat Murders’, the series was released on 13 May 2022. hoichoi will release three episodes every week till June 3. This season was directed by Soumik Haldar.

References

External links

Indian web series
2022 web series debuts
Bengali-language web series
Thriller web series
Hoichoi original programming